Tom O’Sullivan was an Irish sportsperson who played hurling with the Cork senior inter-county team in the 1950s.

O'Sullivan first came to prominence with the Cork senior hurlers in the early 1950s.  He first tasted success in 1953 when he played in the corner-forward position as Cork defeated Galway in one of the dirtiest championship deciders ever.  In 1954 O'Sullivan won his first Munster title as a player, however, he played no part in Cork’s subsequent All-Ireland victory over Wexford.

Cork inter-county hurlers
Year of birth missing
Possibly living people